USS LST-348  was a United States Navy  that was built and deployed during World War II. The ship was constructed throughout late 1942 and early 1943 before being deployed to the European theater, where it undertook supply operations in support of Allied troops in North Africa and Italy. It was sunk by a German U-boat in February 1944.

Construction 
LST-348 was constructed at the Norfolk Naval Yard beginning on November 10, 1942, to be used for convoy operations in the European theater. The ship was launched on February 7, 1943 and commissioned two days later. Under the command of Lieutenant Stephenson Jennings, an officer in the United States Naval Reserve, the ship was assigned to the European theater.

Service history 
LST-348 joined the Italian Campaign of World War II by July 1943 deploying supplies and reinforcements throughout North Africa and Italian coastline in support of the Allied invasion of Sicily.  In September 1943, the ship supported Operation Avalanche, the landings at Salerno. On January 22, 1944, LST-348 was assigned to support the Anzio beachhead. In late January, the ship was heavily attacked by Axis aircraft while operating around the beachhead, resulting in several near misses. After moving further south, the ship came under heavy bombardment from shore-based artillery before being relieved by LST-377 in early February.

On February 20, 1944, while sailing from Nisida to Anzio, LST-348 was struck on her port side by a torpedo fired from the German U-boat U-410. LST-348 was struck once more on her port side before orders were received to abandon ship. The ship was the ordered to be scuttled starting a large fire on board which would be extinguished once a third and final torpedo would sink the ship. Twenty-four members of the ship's crew perished, while 79 were rescued. Two battle stars were awarded to the ship for its World War II service. Following the ship's sinking, an investigation found that at the time of the attack, LST-348 had not been at the required readiness condition. Her guns had not been manned and only limited lookouts had been stationed. Jennings was subsequently reprimanded for these oversights.

References

Citations

Bibliography

Further reading

External links
 "Wreck of USS LST-348", retrieved March 30, 2017

LST-1-class tank landing ships of the United States Navy
World War II amphibious warfare vessels of the United States
1943 ships